Helen L. Weiss (January 29, 1920 - February 20, 1948) was an American composer, pianist and choir director.

Biography
Helen Weiss was born in Brooklyn, New York to Samuel and Sadie (Friedman) Weiss. She had two brothers, Bernard and Frank. The family moved to Philadelphia, where Weiss attended the Philadelphia High School for Girls. She earned a B.A. degree in music at the University of Pennsylvania in 1941; an M.A. degree in music at the University of Oklahoma in 1942; and a Ph.D. in music composition from the Eastman School of Music in 1944. She also studied music at the Philadelphia Conservatory (today known as University of the Arts).

After getting her Ph.D., Weiss taught, composed, and performed as a piano soloist, accompanist, and choir director. She edited notes for the University of Pennsylvania Orchestra programs, was a secretary at McGraw Hill Publishing Company, and worked for the University of Pennsylvania Museum.

Weiss traveled to Peru in 1945, where she lectured, performed, and organized a choir at the Peruvian-North American Cultural Institute. After becoming ill with cancer, she returned to the United States for treatment which involved amputating her foot. She accepted a job with the U.S. State Department and returned to South America in March 1947. Her cancer recurred in November, and she came home to her family Philadelphia and died in February 1948. Her papers and several recordings are archived at the University of Pennsylvania.

Weiss' family and friends created the Helen L. Weiss Music Prize at the University of Pennsylvania in 1964. It is awarded for the best vocal musical composition of each school year. Recipients of the prize have included composers Emily Anna, Ingrid Arauco, Erica Ball, Jennifer Margaret Barker, Boaz Ben-Moshe, Kai-Young Chan, Catherine Connell, Nathan Courtright, Sharon Hershey, Myoung-jun Lee, Tony Solitro, Hasan Uçarsu, James Ure, and Ricardo Zohn-Muldoon.

Works
Compositions by Helen Weiss include:

Chorale and Variations (piano)
Declaration (orchestra and piano)
I am the People (cantata for mixed chorus)
Plaint
Sonata in a minor
Suite for Piano
Three Poems for Voice and Orchestra (text by Walt Whitman)

References 

American women composers
1920 births
1948 deaths
Musicians from Brooklyn
20th-century American women pianists
20th-century American pianists
20th-century American composers
20th-century women composers
20th-century American conductors (music)
American choral conductors
Women conductors (music)
University of Pennsylvania alumni
University of Oklahoma alumni
Eastman School of Music alumni
University of Pennsylvania staff
Deaths from cancer in Pennsylvania